Paul Sabatier may refer to:

Paul Sabatier (chemist) (1854–1941), French chemist and Nobel Prize winner
Paul Sabatier (theologian) (1858–1928), French clergyman and historian

See also
Paul Sabatier University, named after the chemist